Emma-Rose Taylor-Isherwood (born April 27, 1987) is a Canadian actress.  She played the roles of Mona Parker in the animated television series Mona the Vampire and Josie Trent in the science fiction program Strange Days at Blake Holsey High.

Biography
Taylor-Isherwood was born on April 27, 1987 in Toronto, Ontario. She began her career at the age of 9, with a voice role in the animated special Teddy Bears Rescue, before lending her voice for Miffy: Colors, Numbers & Shapes and Mona the Vampire. She has appeared in movies including Tales from the Neverending Story, The Shipping News and Who Gets The House.

Nominated for two Young Artist Awards for her roles in Mary Cassatt an American Impressionist and Strange Days at Blake Holsey High, one of Taylor-Isherwood roles was of young Agnes in the Golden Globe nominated film The Shipping News directed by Lasse Hallstrom.

She played the free-spirited, adventurous intelligent, and intrusive Josie Trent on Strange Days at Blake Holsey High, also known as Black Hole High. At the 24th Annual Young Artist Awards (2003), Taylor-Isherwood was nominated for Supporting Young Actress in a TV series (comedy or drama), for the series. She was on a camping trip, when she found out she got the part as "Josie" on Strange Days.

She is represented by Amanda Rosenthall Talent Agency and Butler Ruston Bell Agency.

Personal life

When Taylor-Isherwood was around eight years old, she asked her parents if she could have acting lessons. She was in the habit of starting a lesson (such as  dance or piano) and then quickly giving it up. So her parents made a compromise:  she could take acting lessons if she made the money for it herself. Taylor-Isherwood began making papier-mâché hats.  The Ottawa Citizen heard of it, and wrote an article on her. After that article, she made the money she needed to go to acting lessons.

She is the older sister of actress Sally Taylor-Isherwood.

Taylor-Isherwood attended Canterbury High School in Ottawa, where she graduated from the drama program in 2005. She played the part of Henry Higgins' mother in Canterbury High School's 2004 production of My Fair Lady.

Taylor-Isherwood has dual Canadian and British citizenship and is fluent in both English and French.

In 2009, she graduated from Carleton University in Ottawa, Ontario with a Bachelor of Arts degree.

After graduating from the Arts Canterbury Theatre program Taylor-Isherwood continued performing while attending university.  After performing alongside Daryl Hannah, in All the Good Ones are Married, Taylor-Isherwood headed to Britain where she completed third year studies in Mass Communication and Film at the University of East Anglia. Along with her film and communications courses she studied Shakespeare, British theatre and scene study.

While in England she also volunteered and performed with the Minotaur Theatre Company on the university campus. Taylor-Isherwood completed her studies in Canada and was awarded High Honours in her Bachelor of Arts, (Communication /Film) degree. 
After completing certification in "The Art of Directing," through SIFT, she voiced both Holly Bear and Eliza, in The Secret World of Benjamin Bear, for Amberwood studios. She also acted alongside her sister Sally in the live action series, Overruled!. Emma also voiced Camille Wallaby in the animated series The Mysteries of Alfred Hedgehog, airing on TVO. She also played the British Elspeth in the animated series Gawayn.

Filmography

References

External links
 Agence Claire Boivin Agency
 

1987 births
Living people
21st-century British actresses
21st-century Canadian actresses
Actresses from Toronto
British child actresses
British film actresses
British television actresses
British voice actresses
Canadian child actresses
Canadian film actresses
Canadian people of British descent
Canadian television actresses
Canadian voice actresses
Carleton University alumni